Portugalosuchus (meaning "crocodile from Portugal") is an extinct genus of eusuchian crocodyliform that was possibly a basal crocodylian – if so then it would be the oldest known crocodylian to date. The type species is P. azenhae, described in 2018, and it is known from the Late Cretaceous (Cenomanian)-aged Tentugal Formation in Portugal. A 2021 morphological study recovered Portugalosuchus within Crocodylia as a member of Gavialidae closely related to similar "thoracosaurs" (e.g. Thoracosaurus), while also noting that is might also possibly be outside of Crocodylia completely. A 2022 tip dating analysis incorporating both morphological and DNA data placed Portugalosuchus outside of Crocodylia, as the sister taxon of the family Allodaposuchidae. A cladogram simplified after that analysis is shown below:

References 

Neosuchians
Prehistoric pseudosuchian genera
Cenomanian genera
Late Cretaceous reptiles of Europe
Cretaceous Portugal
Fossils of Portugal
Fossil taxa described in 2018
Taxa named by Octávio Mateus